Jagadananda Roy (1869-1933) was an scientific article writer as well as Bengali science fiction writer. His works were primarily written for teens.

Born in an aristocratic family from Krishnanagar, Nadia, he went to teach in a missionary school and wrote popular articles on science. He met Rabindranath Tagore who edited a journal called Sadhana and Roy later joined to become a teacher at Rabindranath Tagore's Visva Bharati.

He also wrote numerous books on science including such as Prakrtiki Paricay, Vijnanacarya Jagadis Basur Abiskar, Vaijnaniki, Prakrtiki, Jnanasopan, Grahanaksatra, Pokamakad (on insects), Vijnaner Galpa, Gachpala, Mach-byang-sap, sabda, Pakhi (on birds), Naksatracena (on stars).

Roy wrote one of the earliest science fiction stories in Bengali, Shukra Bhraman (Travels to Venus) in 1892, later published in his book Prakritiki (1914). This described travel to Venus and conjured up alien creatures on Uranus. His humanoid aliens are described as resembling apes, with dense black fur, large heads and long nails. This imaginative science-fiction preceded that of H. G. Wells' somewhat similar The War of the Worlds (1898) by about a decade.

See also
Bengali science fiction
Charu Chandra Bhattacharya

References

3.কল্পবিজ্ঞানের ছোটগল্প 'শুক্র ভ্রমণ'প্রোফেসর শঙ্কুরও আগে

External links
 Biography

Bengali-language literature
Bengali-language writers
Bengali writers
1869 births
1933 deaths
20th-century Bengalis
19th-century Bengalis
Bengali Hindus
Bengali-language science fiction writers
Bengali novelists
Academic staff of Visva-Bharati University
Scholars from West Bengal
People from Krishnagar
People from Nadia district
Indian writers
Indian male writers
19th-century Indian writers
19th-century Indian male writers
20th-century Indian writers
20th-century Indian male writers
Indian science fiction writers
Indian speculative fiction writers
Indian essayists
Indian male essayists
20th-century Indian essayists
19th-century Indian essayists
Indian columnists